Edward Murphy (April 1881 – 25 May 1916) was an English professional football forward who played in the Football League for Glossop and Bury.

Personal life 
Murphy served as a private in the North Staffordshire Regiment during the First World War and was wounded on the Western Front. He was evacuated to Britain and died of his wounds at King George V Military Hospital, London on 25 May 1916. Murphy was buried in Tunstall Cemetery, Stoke-on-Trent.

Career statistics

References

1881 births
People from Tunstall, Staffordshire
English footballers
Association football outside forwards
English Football League players
British Army personnel of World War I
British military personnel killed in World War I
1916 deaths
Association football inside forwards
Glossop North End A.F.C. players
Bury F.C. players
Swindon Town F.C. players
Bristol Rovers F.C. players
Southern Football League players
Denaby United F.C. players
North Staffordshire Regiment soldiers
Military personnel from Staffordshire